Luca Daniel Langoni (born 9 February 2002) is an Argentine footballer currently playing as a forward for Boca Juniors.

Club career
Born in Gregorio de Laferrère, Buenos Aires, Langoni made his debut for Boca Juniors in June 2022. He made an explosive start to his Boca Juniors career, and has been noted for his natural goalscoring ability.

Career statistics

Club

Notes

Honours
Boca Juniors
Primera División: 2022
Supercopa Argentina: 2022

References

2002 births
Living people
Footballers from Buenos Aires
Argentine footballers
Association football forwards
Argentine Primera División players
Boca Juniors footballers